The Phoenix Industries B1Z ParaFlyer (sometimes called the B12 or B1-Z) is an American paramotor that was designed and produced by Phoenix Industries of Southampton, New Jersey for powered paragliding.

The aircraft is out of production and the company no longer in business.

Design and development
The aircraft was designed to comply with the US FAR 103 Ultralight Vehicles rules. It features a rectangular paraglider-style wing, single-place accommodation and a single  Zenoah G-25 engine in pusher configuration, with recoil start. As is the case with all paramotors, take-off and landing is accomplished by foot.

Two different canopies were factory options.

The aircraft can be modified into a powered parachute by the addition of a wheeled cart that mounts the engine package. The cart weighs .

Specifications (B1Z ParaFlyer)

References

1990s United States ultralight aircraft
Single-engined pusher aircraft
Paramotors
Phoenix Industries aircraft